
The following table lists technical information for assumed reputable DNS blacklists used for blocking spam.

Notes

"Collateral listings"—Deliberately listing non-offending IP addresses, in order to coerce ISPs to take action against spammers under their control.

"Notifies upon listing"—Warns registrants of listed IP addresses or domains (so registrants can take actions to fix problems).

Suspect RBL providers
Suspect RBL providers are those who employ well-documented patterns of questionable or reckless practices or have questionable actors based on statements or communications from the RBL's principal management to official forums. These practices usually include acceptance of de-listing payments (also known as ransom payments) - which incentivizes fraud - such as is the case with UCEPROTECT/Whitelisted.org. Often, these RBL providers use circular rhetoric such as "only spammers would claim we are illegitimate" in furtherance of their scheme. These RBL providers have shown clear or lengthy patterns of misconduct or unstable behavior in public forums or operations or both. It is recommended that ISPs carefully consider these RBL providers before incorporating them into spam blocking regimens. These RBL providers have demonstrated the potential and willingness to adversely affect vast swaths of internet communications for misguided, reckless or likely fraudulent purposes. Using these RBL providers will likely result in clogging up ISP support channels while negatively affecting legitimate business customers.

References

External links 
 List of all RBLs, Information about all existing blacklists including discontinued blacklists.

Spamming